Arachidonyl trifluoromethyl ketone (ATK) is an analog of arachidonic acid. that inhibits some isoforms of the enzyme phospholipase A2. Specifically it inhibits the 85 kDa cystolic PLA2 (cPLA2).

It has been studied as a neuroprotective agent after spinal cord injury, and in animal models of multiple sclerosis.

See also
 Spinal stenosis

References

Ketones
Trifluoromethyl compounds
Arachidonyl compounds